Evgeny Nudler is an American biochemist, currently the Julie Wilson Anderson Professor at New York University School of Medicine. He is an investigator with the Howard Hughes Medical Institute and is best known for his pioneering work on the molecular mechanisms of transcription elongation and termination, mechanisms of cellular adaptation to genotoxic and proteotoxic stress, as well as his role in the discovery of riboswitches and RNA polymerase backtracking.

References

Year of birth missing (living people)
Living people
New York University Grossman School of Medicine faculty
American biochemists